Thomas Dwyer Bass,  (6 June 1916 – 26 February 2010) was a renowned Australian sculptor. Born in Lithgow, New South Wales, he studied at the Dattilo Rubbo Art School and the National Art School. Bass served in the Second Australian Imperial Force during the Second World War, rising to the rank of sergeant. He established the Tom Bass Sculpture School in Sydney in 1974. In 1988, he was made a Member of the Order of Australia (AM) for services to sculpture. In 2009, he was admitted to the degree of Doctor of Visual Arts (honoris causa) at the University of Sydney.

A retrospective of his work, spanning 60 years, was exhibited at the Sydney Opera House between 9 November and 17 December 2006.

Totem maker 
After graduating from the National Art School, Bass developed his philosophy of working as a sculptor as being the maker of totemic forms and emblems, that is, work expressing ideas of particular significance to communities or to society at large. Examples of his work include The Trial of Socrates and The Idea of a University at Wilson Hall, Melbourne University; The Falconer on Main Building at University of New South Wales, representing the conflict between beauty and the intellect; the winged figure of Ethos in Civic Square, Canberra, representing the spirit of the community, and the Lintel sculpture at the National Library, Canberra, representing the idea of Library. Over a twenty-five-year period this remained virtually the single focus of his work as he became the most sought after public sculptor in Australia. He is represented all over Australia and also overseas.

Contribution to art in Australia 
While engaged with his public sculptures, Bass remained largely on the periphery of the evolving art scene in post-Second World War Australia. His contribution to art often went unacknowledged as the focus for artists evolved around the ever growing gallery and art market scene. Art as commodity was never Bass's reason for making sculpture. During the 50s and 60s Bass "..was the only Australian sculptor who understood the importance of bringing art to the widest possible audience. ...With every major commission Bass aimed to push the boundaries of public taste, giving his audience a lesson in the visual language of modernism."

P & O Wall fountain 

1962–63, Copper 107×800×55 cm, commissioned by P&O Orient Lines of Australia P/L in 1961, 55 Hunter Street, Sydney.
Designed as a purely abstract wall fountain, this sculpture did not symbolize any particular aspect of the P&O Company. Bass's sculpture caused considerable controversy when it was completed in 1963. When the work was unveiled, its indirect resemblance to a Parisian pissoir and its position opposite the French Airline office provoked a witty comment in the sixth edition of OZ magazine (1964) about the city's latest status symbol as a convenience for the people of Sydney and as a welcoming sign to French travellers: "there is a nominal charge, of course, but don't worry, there is no need to pay immediately. Just P. & O." (pee and owe). With it they published a renowned satirical photograph which showed the fountain apparently being used as a urinal, with a caption which read  "Pictured is a trio of Sydney natives P. & O.'ing in the Bass urinal". For this and other supposed offences the editors of the magazine, Richard Neville, Richard Walsh and Martin Sharp were charged, tried and sentenced to jail with hard labour for "obscenity and encouraging public urination", although the defendants subsequently appealed against the sentences, which were revoked. In the trial Tom Bass appeared in their defence.
Although the building is no longer owned by P&O, the work maintains an iconic presence in Sydney. The building was demolished in December 2017 for the construction of the entrance to the Martin Place Sydney Metro station 23 metres below street level, and the wall fountain will be reinstalled into the public space of the replacement building.

AGC sculpture
1963, Copper 335.3×152.4×38 cm
Commissioned by AGC (Australian Guarantee Corporation) Australia in 1962 for AGC House, 126 Phillip Street, Sydney When the original building was completely demolished in 2002, the work was salvaged, restored and reinstalled by Investa Property Group into the Foster and Partners designed building in late 2005.
The AGC sculpture is an emblem inspired by the corporate and financial transactions in what was then known as the hire purchase system. It takes the form of a mechanical corporate tree in which the branches symbolize the various interests of AGC, as it existed in 1962. The two top branches represent the dominant lending arm and the supporting arm is insurance. These branches support a wheel that symbolizes the automobile which was the first reason for hire purchase. At the base, there are two protective arms, similar to tree roots that signify the importance of security and stability.

Amicus certus – AMP sculpture
1962, Copper 451×424×40 cm
Commissioned by Australia Mutual Providence in 1960 for AMP Building (or House), 33 Alfred Street, Sydney.
The AMP emblem (logo) signifies the value of insurance in our daily family life. Redesigned by Bass for the iconic Sydney Cove building, the central figure represents the Goddess of Plenty who watches over the family figures represented by a mother, father and child, reflecting AMP's motto:  (a true friend in uncertain times). To this day, the Sydney Cove building remains the Australian headquarters of AMP.

Research – ICI sculpture
1959, Copper 686×206×35 cm
Commissioned by ICI (Imperial Chemical Industries) in 1956 for 61 Macquarie Street. In 1999, with the assistance of Mirvac, the sculpture was relocated to the north wall of Quay Grand Suites, adjacent to the Moore Steps, Sydney.
It is a sculptural tribute to industry and scientific research. The crucible, held up by five figures, is the vessel in which the raw materials are synthesized. Each figure represent an agent of change to process those materials: electricity, radiation, chemical changes, heat and mechanical forces. The agents dip into the crucible to achieve change. The star represents the sun, a source of energy and transformation. The final product rises out of the crucible in the form of the ICI symbol.

The Sisters (Variations I, II & III 1980)
Bronze, 80×250×240 cm
Originally exhibited in Bass's first solo exhibition at the Sydney David Jones Gallery in 1980, the work reappeared in public at Martin Place for Sculpture in the City 2001 as part of Art About. Through their various poses, Bass plays with the illusion that all the entwining female figures are physically different. In fact, the two outward figures were cast as exact copies. 
The Sisters express sheer joy and exuberance equalled by Bass's admiration of the Sydney Opera House. Their deliberate placement by Bass on the path to the Opera House heralds this excitement for visitors on approaching this iconic architectural masterpiece.

Tom Bass Sculpture Studio School
After an intense career as a public sculptor, Bass felt that sculpture as a medium of social communication was losing its relevance. He went through a period of life review and went back to teach at the National Art School. He soon decided that it was not possible for him to teach in the way he wanted under that system. So he conceived the idea of setting up an independent school of sculpture. He began a long search to find an appropriate place for the school. This culminated in the warehouse above Broadway, a space which had been occupied by goldsmiths ever since its completion in 1911. He spent a year cleaning the space and preparing it for classes and in 1974 classes began in the studio.

The school moved from Broadway to Erskineville in 1998, where it continues to run sculpture classes today.

Selected works
The Student, sandstone, main gates, University of Sydney, 1953.
The falconer, electrolytic copper, Main Building, University of New South Wales, 1955. UNSW Art Collection Sculpture Walk
Fountain figure, electrolytic copper, Chancellor's Court, University of New South Wales, 1959.
The Idea of a University, reconstituted stone, The University of Melbourne, 1954–59.
The Trial of Socrates, copper, The University of Melbourne, 1954–59.
 Research, copper. ICI Building, Sydney, 1956–59
Ethos, copper, Civic Square, Canberra, 1959–61.
AMP Emblem, copper, AMP building, Sydney, 1962
AGC sculpture, copper. AGC House, Sydney, 1962–63
Children's Tree, bronze, CML building, Elizabeth St, Melbourne, 1963.
P&O wall fountain, copper, P&O building, Hunter St, Sydney, 1963.
Lintel sculpture, copper bas-relief, National Library of Australia, Canberra, 1967–1968.
The Genii, bronze, Queen Victoria Gardens, Melbourne, 1973.
Don Bradman bust in Cricket Captains' Walk, Cootamundra, NSW, 2008.

See also
 List of public art in the City of Sydney

References

External links

 
 Tom Bass Sculpture Studio School

20th-century Australian sculptors
Members of the Order of Australia
1916 births
2010 deaths
People from the Central Tablelands
National Art School alumni
Australian Army personnel of World War II
Australian Army soldiers